Butyllithium may refer to one of 5 isomeric organolithium reagents of which 3 are commonly used in chemical synthesis:

n-Butyllithium, abbreviated BuLi or nBuLi
sec-Butyllithium,  abbreviated sec-BuLi or sBuLi, has 2 stereoisomers, but is commonly used as racemate
isobutyllithium
tert-Butyllithium, abbreviated tert-BuLi or tBuLi